Vermont Route 100 (VT 100) is a north–south state highway in Vermont in the United States. VT 100 is the state's longest numbered highway of any type.

Route description
The southern terminus of the route is at the Massachusetts state line in Stamford, where it continues south as Route 8. Its northern terminus is at VT 105 in the town of Newport, which lies on the Canadian border. VT 100 passes along the eastern edge of the Green Mountain National Forest for much of its length and also passes through the Mad River Valley. It runs parallel to, and lies between, U.S. Route 7 (US 7) to the west and US 5 to the east.

The road is the main thoroughfare for some of Vermont's most well-known resort towns, including Wilmington, Ludlow, Killington, Warren, and Stowe. As such, many of Vermont's ski resorts are located either directly on, or in proximity to, VT 100; these include Okemo Mountain Resort, Mount Snow, Killington, Sugarbush, Mad River Glen, Stowe Mountain Resort and Jay Peak.

VT 100 is a popular tourist route during the fall (for foliage) and winter (for skiing), and can be heavily trafficked during those seasons. Despite this, the road retains a rural feel through most of the towns it traverses and is relatively free of development, except for some of the areas around the ski resorts. The most populous town through which VT 100 passes is Morristown, with a population of just over 5,200.

Several of the most heavily traveled sections of VT 100 (such as the section between Waterbury and Stowe and Warren to Waitsfield) were in very poor condition due to state and local road maintenance budget shortfalls, recent harsh winters and heavy damage by Tropical Storm Irene; since that storm, the state has undertaken the reconstruction of many segments of the road.

Major intersections

Suffixed routes

VT 100A

Vermont Route 100A (VT 100A) is a short auxiliary route of VT 100 in Bridgewater. The route generally runs in a northeast–southwest direction.

VT 100B

Vermont Route 100B (VT 100B) is a spur route that branches off of VT 100 in Moretown. The route, which runs in a northeast–southwest direction, connects VT 100 to U.S. Route 2 in Middlesex.

VT 100C

Vermont Route 100C (VT 100C) is a spur route of VT 100 that begins in Hyde Park and runs southwest to an intersection with VT 15 in Johnson.

References

External links

100
Transportation in Addison County, Vermont
Transportation in Bennington County, Vermont
Transportation in Lamoille County, Vermont
Transportation in Orleans County, Vermont
Transportation in Rutland County, Vermont
Transportation in Washington County, Vermont
Transportation in Windham County, Vermont
Transportation in Windsor County, Vermont